Ściechów  is a village in the administrative district of Gmina Lubiszyn, within Gorzów County, Lubusz Voivodeship, in western Poland.  

Notable residents 
 Hans Grünberg (1917-1998), Luftwaffe pilot

References 

Villages in Gorzów County